The 2010–11 season will be the 2nd consecutive year in the top flight of Indonesian football.

Players

Appearances and goals
Last updated on 27 September.

|}

Top scorers
Includes all competitive matches. The list is sorted by shirt number when total goals are equal.

Last updated on 27 September

Psps Pekanbaru
PSPS Pekanbaru